The Gornja Slatina Mosque is a cultural heritage monument in Gornja Slatina, Vitina, Kosovo.

Description
Although dedicated in 1924, the plaque on the front door attributes the mosque to a construction date between 1905 and 1907. A local nobleman named Emin Aga spearheaded construction, hiring 12 craftsmen from the Sanjak of Dibra, including mason Halit Ymeri. The building is stone with lime mortar.

References

Historic sites in Kosovo
Mosques in Kosovo